A radiole is a heavily ciliated feather-like tentacle found in highly organized clusters on the crowns of Canalipalpata. Canalipalpata is an order of sessile marine polychaete worms consisting of 31 families (including the Sabellidae, Serpulidae, Terebellidae, and Alvinellidae, a family of deep-sea worms associated with hydrothermal vents). These benthic annelid tube worms employ radioles primarily for alimentation. While their primary role is to function as an organ for filter feeding, radioles also serve as respiratory organs. Because of their role in gas exchange, radioles are often referred to as "gills".

Anatomical location
Canalipalpata have a head located at the anterior end of the body. The head is formed by the fusion of a funnel-shaped, symmetrical peristomium with the prostomium. The prostomium bears a specialized mouth appendage which is referred to as a branchial crown. The crown functions as both a sieve and a gill. The animal can extend the crown from its calcareous tube for feeding and gas exchange, and rapidly retract it when disturbed or threatened.

The crown consists of two bundles (one right and one left) of featherlike tentacles known as branchiae, or radioles. Each of these bundles consists of a single row of radioles attached to a branchial stalk and curved into a semicircle. These two semicircles form the funnel-shaped branchial crown. The mouth is located at the apex of the funnel, between the two branchial stalks.

An adult worm typically has about 40 radioles in its crown, covered by tiny, hair-like branches called cilia. This arrangement gives the crown the appearance of a small fan or feather duster (for which the animals are often referred to as fanworms, or feather duster worms). When extended, these heavily ciliated radioles trap particles of organic matter and transport them towards the mouth.

Use in filter feeding
The ventral surface of each radiole is covered by cilia that rhythmically move in such a way as to create a current in the surrounding water column. This current carries planktonic particles from the underside of the crown upwards through the net of radioles to the dorsal surface.

The dorsal or upper side of each radiole has a ciliated longitudinal radiolar food groove running down its center, extending along its longitudinal axis from the tip to the center of the crown. Planktonic food particles are swept into these grooves, where they become trapped in a coating of mucus. At this point, the animal subjects the particles to an examination and selection process, whereby any particles determined to be unsuitable due to size or chemical composition are rejected by the animal and discarded back into the water column. Once the selection process is complete, the cilia transport the particles towards the mouth, from where they enter the digestive tract.

Use of radioles in respiration
While they are primarily feeding structures, the radioles also serve as respiratory organs. Because of this role in gas exchange, the structures are commonly referred to as "gills".

Pigmentation
The radioles of different species of Canalipalpata vary widely in color. Those of the serpulid tubeworms are typically red, pink, or orange in color, with white transverse bands. Astaxanthin, a carotenoid pigment, is responsible for the bright red color of the crown of Serpula vermicularis.

Growth and regeneration
Juvenile and other worms of small size have small crowns and radioles, so prefer to capture and eat very small particles, such as bacterioplankton and single-celled phytoplankton and zooplankton. As a worm matures and grows in size, so does its crown. The larger crown allows the animal to feed on larger multicellular plankton. The preferred food size depends on the maximum size achieved by the adult worm.

Canalipalpata worms often lose one or more radioles, or even the entire crown as a result of predation by other animals or other types of trauma. Some species even appear to have the ability to control the loss of their tentacular crowns, in much the same manner as when a lizard loses its tail. In certain circumstances, sacrifice of the crown may permit escape or confer some other benefit to the animal. Separation of the crown occurs at a pre-established zone of abscission, located at the base of the crown.

These animals have the ability to regenerate new radioles to replace those that have been amputated, or even the entire crown if necessary. Any would-be predators that pass by after a worm has lost its crown will get the impression that the worm has died; this protects the animal from further attack. The crown typically reappears after about two weeks. When it does reappear, it is initially smaller in size, but it eventually grows back to its former size and color.

Specialized radioles
In addition to having ordinary radioles, some Canalipalpata possess one or more highly modified radioles located on the dorsal part of the head. This specialized structure is called an operculum. The operculum is a cone-shaped cartilaginous structure located at the distal end of a long cartilaginous stalk. When threatened or disturbed, the animal withdraws rapidly into its protective calcareous tube and employs the operculum as a plug to occlude the entrance to the tube. The operculum, which is usually similar in color to the other radioles, secretes a mucus which seems to possess antibiotic properties. It is not unusual for the animal to have two crowns, and hence two opercula.

Serpulids and sabellids are two families of the Sabellida suborder of Canalipalpata tubeworms that are similar in nearly every respect, but they can be readily distinguished by the fact that while both have radioles, the sabellids (such as Sabella pavonina) lack an operculum.

Gallery

References

Annelid anatomy
Polychaetes